The Peugeot 2008 is a subcompact crossover SUV (B-segment) produced by the French automaker Peugeot. Unveiled at the 2013 Geneva Motor Show and positioned below the 3008, the first 2008 replaced the Peugeot 207 SW, as Peugeot did not release an SW version of its 208.



First generation (A94; 2013)

The first-generation 2008 was developed under code name "A94" and is based on the PF1 platform, sharing electronic components with Peugeot 208. The revised version was presented at the Geneva Motor Show in March 2016.

The 2008, the mass production of which also started, is the first product of the joint venture between the two companies of Peugeot and IKCO named IKAP. The 2008's six speed automatic gearbox transfers the engine power to the front wheels. It is available with a five speed manual gearbox, or a six speed manual, according to engine size. As of 2017, it became available with a six speed automatic (1.2 turbo petrol).

The Peugeot 2008 is available with Peugeot's grip control system. This is available on 1.6-litre petrol and 1.6-litre diesel models. Grip control equipped models are supplied with all season M+S Tyres of Goodyear.

Facelift 
The facelifted version of the 2008 was released in February 2016.In Brazil, the 2008 gets a new facelift in 2019. Since March 2015, the Peugeot 2008 is produced in Porto Real and exported to Mercosur countries.

In June 2022, the 2008 gets a new two-tone option (roof, mirrors, part of the tailgate) for 2023 model-year.

Second generation (P24; 2019)

On 19 June 2019, Peugeot officially announced the second generation of the model, based on PSA's new Common Modular Platform (CMP) shared with other models of the PSA Group, such as the second generation 208, DS 3 Crossback and the Opel Corsa F.

ICE versions 
At the time of release, Peugeot announced five internal combustion engine (ICE) options:

Petrol 
 1.2 L PureTech 100 S&S six-speed manual, or eight-speed automatic
 1.2 L PureTech 130 S&S six-speed manual, six-speed automatic or eight-speed automatic
 1.2 L PureTech 155 S&S eight-speed automatic (only for GT trim)

Diesel 
 1.5 L BlueHDi 100 S&S 6-speed manual
 1.5 L BlueHDi 130 S&S 8-speed automatic

Electric version 
The electric drive version, named the e-2008, features a  electric motor and 46.2 kWh of usable battery (50 kWh in total), capable of 310 kilometres (193 miles) of range under the WLTP test.

The vehicle is able to charge at speeds up to 100 kW, if the charging station allows it. It went on sale in Europe in 2020.

Facelift
In 2023, a facelift for the Peugeot 2008 will be launched, featuring a revised grille with the new badge.

Gallery

Awards 
The Peugeot 2008 won the 2021 South African Car of the Year.

Sales

Motorsports
Stéphane Peterhansel won the 2016 Dakar Rally using a Peugeot 2008 DKR, with a mid rear mounted V6 twin turbo diesel engine, offering .

Notes

References

External links

 Official website (United Kingdom)

2010s cars
2020s cars
Cars introduced in 2013
Crossover sport utility vehicles
Front-wheel-drive vehicles
Mini sport utility vehicles
2008
Production electric cars